Behind the Frame: The Finest Scenery is an adventure game created by Taiwanese developer Silver Lining Studio, and co-published by Akupara Games and Akatsuki Taiwan Inc. The game was released for Microsoft Windows, macOS, iOS, and Android in August 2021, then for Nintendo Switch and PlayStation 4 in June 2022.

Plot 
With an art style reminiscent of Studio Ghibli, the game sees the player as an artist on the verge of finishing the final art piece for a gallery submission. As the painting nears completion, the player slowly uncovers an emotional history backed by chance and artistry.

Reception 

The game received an aggregate score of 73/100 from Metacritic, indicating mixed or average reviews. Judith Carl of Eurogamer called the game "magical-looking" and the gameplay calming. Rebekah Valentine of IGN said she never got tired of watching it, calling it "peaceful" and "Ghibli-looking". Pocket Gamer described the game as "a relaxing experience you’ll likely want to dive into when you’re snuggled up in bed after a long and tiring day at work". PC Gamer stated that "it's left me with a greater appreciation for the times when people I love want to share something with me, whether that's the art they've made, an outfit they've been coordinating, or just a bit of coffee". Alice Bell of Rock Paper Shotgun called Behind the Frame a "very sweet experience that is incredibly relaxed, at the same time as being a very bright, sunshine-filled thing that really inspired me to go out and create something myself".

Awards

References 

2021 video games
Adventure games
Android (operating system) games
IOS games
Indie video games
MacOS games
Nintendo Switch games
PlayStation 4 games
Single-player video games
Video games developed in Taiwan
Windows games
Works about painters
Akupara Games games